The 2022 Grand Prix Hassan II was a professional tennis tournament played in Marrakesh, Morocco on clay courts.

It was the 36th edition of the tournament and was classified as an ATP Tour 250 event on the 2022 ATP Tour. It took place from 4 April to 10 April 2022 after the COVID-19 pandemic forced the postponement of the event twice consecutively from its original schedule of 6 to 12 April 2020.

Champions

Singles 

  David Goffin def.  Alex Molčan, 3–6, 6–3, 6–3

Doubles 

  Rafael Matos /  David Vega Hernández def.  Andrea Vavassori /  Jan Zieliński, 6–1, 7–5

Point and prize money

Point

Prize money 

*per team

Singles main draw entrants

Seeds 

† Rankings are as of 21 March 2022

Other entrants 
The following players received wildcard entry into the singles main draw: 
  Félix Auger-Aliassime
  Elliot Benchetrit
  Malek Jaziri

The following player received entry as an alternate:
  Stefano Travaglia

The following players received entry from qualifying draw:
  Mirza Bašić
  Damir Džumhur
  Vít Kopřiva
  Pavel Kotov

The following player received entry as a lucky loser:
  Bernabé Zapata Miralles

Withdrawals
Before the tournament
  Sebastián Báez → replaced by  Richard Gasquet
  Benjamin Bonzi → replaced by  Henri Laaksonen
  Alexander Bublik → replaced by  Kamil Majchrzak
  Fabio Fognini → replaced by  Stefano Travaglia
  Ilya Ivashka → replaced by  Carlos Taberner
  Pedro Martínez → replaced by  Marco Cecchinato
  Benoît Paire → replaced by  Yannick Hanfmann
  Alexei Popyrin → replaced by  Bernabé Zapata Miralles
  Arthur Rinderknech → replaced by  Hugo Dellien
  Jan-Lennard Struff → replaced by  João Sousa

Doubles main draw entrants

Seeds 

1 Rankings as of March 21, 2022.

Other entrants 
The following pairs received a wildcard into the doubles main draw:
  Walid Ahouda /  Mehdi Benchakroun
  Elliot Benchetrit /  Lamine Ouahab

The following pairs received entry as alternates:
  Mirza Bašić /  Damir Džumhur
  Marco Cecchinato /  Lorenzo Musetti

Withdrawals
Before the tournament
  Pablo Andújar /  Pedro Martinez → replaced by  Federico Delbonis /  Guillermo Durán
  Alexander Bublik /  Jan Zieliński → replaced by  Andrea Vavassori /  Jan Zieliński
  Rohan Bopanna /  Matwé Middelkoop → replaced by  Ariel Behar /  Matwé Middelkoop
  Sebastián Báez /  Rafael Matos → replaced by  Rafael Matos /  David Vega Hernández
  Dan Evans /  Ken Skupski → replaced by  Marco Cecchinato /  Lorenzo Musetti
  Denys Molchanov /  Franko Škugor → replaced by  Mirza Bašić /  Damir Džumhur

References

External links 

 

Grand Prix Hassan II
Grand Prix Hassan II
Hassan
Grand Prix Hassan II
Grand Prix Hassan II